Macrow is a surname. Notable people with the surname include:

Adam Macrow (born 1978), Australian racing driver
Tim Macrow (born 1982), Australian racing driver
William Macrow (1889–1970), Australian cricketer